Trevor Evans may refer to:
Trevor Evans (priest) (born 1937), Anglican priest
Trevor Evans (politician) (born 1981), member of the Australian House of Representatives
Trevor Evans (journalist) (1902–1981), British journalist
Trevor Evans (scientist) (1927–2010), British physicist
Trefor Evans (born 1947), Wales rugby union player
Trevor Evans Award 
Trevor Evans, character in Fireman Sam
Trevor Evans (Suits), a character from Suits
Trevor Evans (Doctors), a character from Doctors